Erich Otto Reinhold Arendt (15 April 1903 – 25 September 1984) was a German poet and translator.

Biography 
He was born into a working family of a school janitor. In his youth, he changed many professions, he worked as an agricultural worker, a theater set designer, a bank clerk, a journalist and a teacher in an experimental school.

In 1926 he became a member of the German Communist Party and from 1928 he was a member of the Association of Proletarian-Revolutionary Authors.

He published his early poetry in the expressionist literary magazine Der Sturm. He made long trips to Germany, Switzerland, France and Spain.

After the Nazi seizure of power in Germany, Arendt who was a Communist and the husband of a half-Jewish woman, emigrated to Switzerland. From 1933 to 1950 he lived in exile. He participated in the Spanish Civil War and fought as part of the International Brigades. Then in 1940 he emigrated through France to Colombia, where he spent almost ten years in Indian settlements. In 1950 he moved to East Germany.  Upon returning, he attempted to join the ruling SED, however this was denied and Arendt was under constant supervision.

He was a member of the Academy of Arts of East Germany.

Erich Arendt died after a stroke. He was buried at the Dorotheenstadt Cemetery in Berlin.

Selected works 

 Trug doch die Nacht den Albatros. Rütten & Loening, Berlin 1951
 Bergwindballade. Gedichte des spanischen Freiheitskampfes. Dietz, Berlin 1952
 Über Asche und Zeit... Volk und Welt, Berlin 1957
 Gesang der sieben Inseln. Rütten & Loening, Berlin 1957
 Flug-Oden., Leipzig 1959
 Unter den Hufen des Winds. Ausgewählte Gedichte 1926–1965. Rowohlt, Reinbek 1966
 Ägäis. Insel, Leipzig 1967
 Aus fünf Jahrzehnten. Auswahl von Heinz Czechowski. Hinstorff, Rostock 1968
 Gedichte. Auswahl von Gerhard Wolf. Reclam, Leipzig 1973
 Feuerhalm. Insel, Leipzig 1973 (IB 986/1)
 Memento und Bild. Insel, Leipzig 1976
 Zeitsaum. Insel, Leipzig 1978
 Starrend von Zeit und Helle. Gedichte der Ägäis. Reclam, Leipzig 1980
 Entgrenzen. Insel, Leipzig 1981

References

1903 births
1984 deaths
German communists
20th-century German poets
20th-century German translators
Communist Party of Germany members
Emigrants from Nazi Germany to Switzerland
Emigrants from Nazi Germany to France
Emigrants from Nazi Germany
International Brigades personnel
German people of the Spanish Civil War
Recipients of the National Prize of East Germany
Recipients of the Patriotic Order of Merit in silver
German Expressionist writers